In Japan,  are standardized by the "" established in 1968 with origins from the Tokyo Metropolitan Police Department's "Order on Standardization of Road Sign" of 1934 and the Home Ministry of Japan's "Order on Road Signs" of 1942. The previous designs have been used since 1986 after several amendments of order.

Principal signs 
 are categorized into 4 types; guide, warning, regulatory and instruction signs.

Guide signs 
 indicates directions or distances of the road. Guide signs have dark green backgrounds and white text for expressways. In urban areas and on national highways, direction signs have dark blue backgrounds. The signs are normally written in Japanese and English. 
Since 2014, Vialog is used as the typeface for English words and Place name Transcriptions.

Warning signs
 warn drivers of dangers or situations that they must pay attention to. Their design, black pattern and border on yellow diamond (usually with 45 cm per a side), is based on the U.S. MUTCD (due to this nation being part of Major non-NATO ally).

Regulatory signs
 show the regulations of each roads in order to keep road condition and prevent dangers of traffic.

The stop sign is a red, downward-pointing triangle, with the text  (tomare) & "stop" (in English, for the pre-1963 and current designs only) in white. Prohibition signs are round with white backgrounds, red borders, and blue pictograms. Mandatory instruction signs are round with blue backgrounds and white pictograms.

Instruction signs 
 show points and devices on the road that drivers should pay attention.

Supplemental signs 
 are usually put just below the principal signs, and shows their valid range like time, day and category of vehicle. They are equivalent to the "plaque" of the American MUTCD. The width of the plates is usually 60 cm, and the sentences should be less than 7 characters per a line or 3 lines. When the sentences can not be shortened less than the limitation, they should apply changeable signs.

Other signs

History

The first standardised road signage schemes appeared in 1922. At first, two types of signs were established: "road warning signs" equivalent to warning signs and "road guide signs" as information signs. Warning signs at that time closely resembled the British design as used in Hong Kong, the only difference was the white-on-black lettering.

Japanese road signs in the early 1940s closely followed European road signage practices at that time based on the 1931 Geneva Convention, except that most road signages contained text. A variation of the early 1940s Japanese road signage system is still in use today in Taiwan.

A complete revision of the "Road Signs Ordinance" was promulgated and enforced as an Ordinance of the Prime Minister's Office and the Ministry of Construction. Unlike the 1922 and the 1940s devised road signs, it included both bilingual Japanese and English text and symbols. Warning signs were changed from a European red-bordered triangular design to an American MUTCD yellow diamond design. This road signage system was used until 1963, when it was replaced with a new road signage system that is based on the Vienna Convention on Road Signs and Signals. The present-day Japanese road signage system also replaced the stop sign's shape with an inverted equilateral triangle like the stop sign used in Germany until 1953.
In 2016, it was announced that the Japanese National Police Agency was considering changing the design of the "Stop" sign used on Japanese roads since 1963 from the inverted red triangle sign to an octagonal design more closely conforming to the recommendations of the 1968 Vienna Convention on Road Signs and Signals. The inverted red triangle sign was introduced in 1963 ahead of the 1964 Tokyo Olympic Games, and replaced the earlier red octagonal sign used from 1960, which in turn had replaced the yellow octagonal sign used from 1950. It was later decided to make the stop sign bilingual in both Japanese and English, but to maintain the inverted triangular shape.

Photographs

References

Bibliography
 
 
 
 
 
 
 

Signs
Japan